The First Ruijs de Beerenbrouck cabinet was the cabinet of the Netherlands from 9 September 1918 until 18 September 1922. The cabinet was formed by the political parties Roman Catholic State Party (RKSP), Anti-Revolutionary Party (ARP) and the Christian Historical Union (CHU) after the election of 1918. The centre-right cabinet was a majority government in the House of Representatives. It was the first of three cabinets of Charles Ruijs de Beerenbrouck, the Leader of the Roman Catholic State Party as Prime Minister.

Cabinet Members

 Resigned.
 Served ad interim.

References

External links
Official

  Kabinet-Ruijs de Beerenbrouck I Parlement & Politiek

Cabinets of the Netherlands
1918 establishments in the Netherlands
1922 disestablishments in the Netherlands
Cabinets established in 1918
Cabinets disestablished in 1922